Hooey Cottage is a historic, cure cottage located at Saranac Lake in the town of Harrietstown, Franklin County, New York.  It was built in 1916 and is a -story dwelling, two- by four-bay, wood frame residence with a cross-gabled roof on a fieldstone foundation.  It features a 2-story cure porch.

It was listed on the National Register of Historic Places in 1992. It is located in the Helen Hill Historic District.

References

Houses on the National Register of Historic Places in New York (state)
Houses completed in 1916
Houses in Franklin County, New York
National Register of Historic Places in Franklin County, New York
Individually listed contributing properties to historic districts on the National Register in New York (state)